The New Zealand Centre for Photography (NZCP) was established in 1985. Founded by Brian Brake, Matheson Beaumont and Brian Enting after they had yearned for an organisation which would provide a fulcrum for photographers of all disciplines to meet together, to show their work and showcase the medium to both New Zealand and the wider world. Due to financial constraints the Centre suspended its services in May 2008 and was wound up in early 2010.

Objectives
(As set out in 1985)

To further and advance photography as an art and to promote public knowledge and appreciation
To organise and conduct public exhibitions of photographs and photographic art and apparatus.
To acquire collect and preserve for public benefit examples of photography and photographic apparatus of historic and artistic interest or importance
By means of research, instructions, information, advice, lectures, publications sources of reference and otherwise to increase and to make publicly available information concerning photography and photographic art apparatus and history
To provide facilities, engage employ and direct staff and do all things needful for or calculated to advance the aforesaid objects.

Direction
When Brake died in 1988, Enting took over as director. He remained there for two years ensuring that the Centre remained viable and that its aims and objectives were both fulfilled and built upon.

Funding
The centre was a registered charitable trust which initially received its funding from an enterprise called Focus on New Zealand and an establishment grant from the New Zealand Lottery Grants Board. (Focus on New Zealand was a tour organised by the trio, bringing together some of the world's leading photographers – amateur and professional. At the time it was considered “revolutionary”.)
The Centre relied on commercial sponsors and a nationwide membership. During its short history it attracted commissions from the Ministries of Education and Foreign Affairs.

New Zealand Journal of Photography
The Centre published a quarterly journal, New Zealand Journal of Photography (NZJP) to provide a forum for debate and exchange on contemporary photography, and the dissemination of research into our photographic histories. The periodical had 64 issues starting in 1992 and ceased in Sept 07. Dedicated to photographic art and history and containing news, views, reviews, portfolios and original research, it is the only national publication of its kind.

Collection
The New Zealand Centre for Photography collection itself was begun on the night of 22 April 1985 during its launch at a Parliamentary reception in Wellington in the company of the then Prime Minister David Lange. The late Rosellina Burri-Bischof presented a print called On the way to Cuzco — Peru taken by her photographer husband Werner Bischof. Shortly after this occasion, the centre was gifted the Geoff Perry collection by his son. Since then the most important acquisitions include the F. Lennard Casbolt collection, the Douglas Hoy collection, Noel Habgood collection, Harry Moult collection, and Mervyn King collection.

The collection numbers around 25,000 items including negatives, slides, albums, unique photographs, technology and a resource library comprising around 1,000 volumes and ephemera.

The centre also housed a camera collection. An unparalleled voyage into photography's technological past. The world's first snapshot camera was made in 1888. And alongside could be a Leica - the camera used by photojournalists since the 1930s to capture a swiftly changing world. Or you might be more intrigued by a sonar auto focus Polaroid, a contemporary tool to seize that elusive image. With its collection of photographic literature and archive of original prints, the Centre stands as New Zealand's only museum of photography. Much of the collection is in storage but a few items are regularly hired by film companies and make it onto the silver screen.

References

Cultural organisations based in New Zealand
Photography in New Zealand